Frenchs Forest Public School, (abbreviated as FFPS) is a school located in Frenchs Forest, New South Wales, Australia. It is a co-educational Public school operated by the New South Wales Department of Education with students from years K to 6. The school was established in 1916 as the first school in the area. Students at the school come from the Forest District and Northern Beaches regions.

History 
Frenchs Forest Public School was first opened for student enrolment in September 1916. In that inaugural year the school consisted of one brick classroom (unfortunately demolished in 1968), one teacher (Mr George Hewitt), and 32 students.

The original school building was situated in a corner of the present school site; at the intersection of two dusty, dirt tracks, now Warringah Road and Forest Way. Most of Frenchs Forest in those early school years was native bush with little habitation or commerce. Orchards, dairy farms, timber mills and piggeries were scattered throughout the area.

Notable alumni
 Peter Debnam - NSW Leader of the Opposition (2005–2007)
 Tracey Dale (nee Pearson) - Miss Australia 1986

See also 
 List of Government schools in New South Wales

References

External links
 Frenchs Forest Public School website

Public primary schools in Sydney
Frenchs Forest, New South Wales
1916 establishments in Australia
Educational institutions established in 1916
School buildings completed in 1916